The Nutcracker Prince is a 1990 Canadian animated romance fantasy film directed by Paul Schibli based on the screenplay by Patricia Watson. It is a retelling of E. T. A. Hoffmann's 1816 short story "The Nutcracker and the Mouse King" and Marius Petipa & Pyotr Ilyich Tchaikovsky's 1892 ballet The Nutcracker, about a girl named Clara who is gifted a special nutcracker by her uncle.  The gift draws her into a world of magic and wonder, and she brings about the conclusion to the legend of The Nutcracker, Prince of the Dolls: a young man named Hans who was transformed into a nutcracker by mice, and can only break the spell if he slays the Mouse King. The film stars Kiefer Sutherland as Hans (The Nutcracker), Megan Follows as Clara, Mike MacDonald as the evil Mouse King, Peter O'Toole as Pantaloon, an old soldier, Phyllis Diller as the Mouse Queen, and Peter Boretski as Uncle Drosselmeier.

The Nutcracker Prince was released by Warner Bros. Pictures in the United States on November 21, 1990, and by Cineplex Odeon Films in Canada on November 23, 1990. The film grossed $1.7 million worldwide against a production budget of $8.5 million. It generally received negative reviews from critics and was considered a commercial failure.

Plot
In 19th century Germany, Clara Stahlbaum, her younger brother Fritz and their family celebrate Christmas Eve, though Clara is jealous that her older sister Louise already has a boyfriend, leaving her wondering about growing up. She immediately cheers up when Drosselmeier, an eccentric toymaker and family friend, arrives at their home with special gifts: a fully automated toy castle for everyone, and a Nutcracker for Clara. While trying to crack nuts with it, Fritz damages the Nutcracker. To cheer the heartbroken Clara up, Drosselmeier tells her a story about how the Nutcracker came to be the Prince of the Dolls.

As Drosselmeier relates, there were a King and a Queen who had a beautiful but vain daughter named Pirlipat. To celebrate the King's birthday, the Queen made a special cake out of blue cheese, but the scent of the cheese drew out all the castle mice, who ate and destroyed the cake. Enraged at it, the King commanded Drosselmeier, his inventor, to capture all the mice; Drosselmeier and his nephew, Hans, succeeded, but the Mouse Queen and her son escaped. In revenge, the Mouse Queen cast a spell on Pirlipat, causing her to become hideously ugly, and Drosselmeier was given the task of figuring out how to cure her. He eventually learned that the fabled Krakatooth Nut could cure her, and the King commanded all the princes and noblemen in the realm to apply, with the promise of marriage to Pirlipat once she was cured. However, the Krakatooth was so hard that all the men's teeth shattered upon trying to crack it. Drosselmeier was about to be executed for his failure when Hans stepped in and cracked the nut, thus curing Pirlipat. Furious, the Mouse Queen cast a spell on Hans, turning him into a Nutcracker. During the subsequent ruckus, she was killed by a falling statue, and her son's tail was damaged. Now free of his domineering mother, he made himself King of the Mice and swore revenge on Hans, while Drosselmeier was exiled by the ungrateful King.

Clara is upset by the story's ending, but Drosselmeier tells her that the Nutcracker will break his curse if he can defeat the Mouse King. In the middle of the night, Clara returns to the living room to spend time with the Nutcracker, when suddenly the Mouse King and an army of mice appear. A ghostly apparition of Drosselmeier also arrives and casts a spell that breathes life into all the dolls, including the Nutcracker, Marie, Trudy and the toy soldier Pantaloon. The two parties engage in battle, in which course the Mouse King threatens to kill the Nutcracker. Clara prevents this by throwing her slipper at the Mouse King, but then slips on a toy cannonball, falls backwards and hits her head, losing consciousness. The next morning, while she recovers, Drosselmeier comes visiting. Clara accuses him of putting the Nutcracker - his enchanted nephew - in danger, but Drosselmeier explains that only Clara can help him break the curse.

That night, the Mouse King returns, angry about Clara's interference. Clara briefly traps him within her bedside table drawer, but when she retrieves the Nutcracker, the Mouse King escapes and threatens to harm her kitten, Pavlova, if she doesn't hand the Nutcracker over. Drosselmeier reappears, and the toys awaken once more. The Nutcracker faces the Mouse King in single combat and defeats him, but Pantaloon is damaged while trying to help him. In order to get him cured, Nutcracker, Trudy and Marie prepare to travel to the Land of the Dolls through Drosselmeier's mechanical castle; Clara accompanies them after Drosselmeier magically shrinks her. However, the Mouse King, though critically wounded, has survived the duel and pursues them.

Arriving at the royal castle of the Land of the Dolls, Clara is given a grand welcome, but although she has fallen in love with the Nutcracker, she hesitates in joining him as his princess. Her reluctance negates the spell which animated the dolls, and they revert to lifeless toys. The Mouse King appears and goes after Clara with his dying strength, but ends up falling off the castle's balcony and drowning in the lake below. As Clara begins crying for the Nutcracker, mist begins to fill the castle, and she abruptly finds herself back home and the Nutcracker missing. Clara rushes to Drosselmeier's workshop, where she anxiously asks him about whether all what she has gone through was real, when they are joined by Hans, now cured of his curse and back to human form.

Voice cast
 Kiefer Sutherland as Prince Hans/The Nutcracker
 Megan Follows as Clara Stahlbaum
 Peter Boretski as Elias Christian Drosselmeier
 Phyllis Diller as  The Mouse Queen
 Mike MacDonald as The Mouse King
 Peter O'Toole as Pantaloon
 Lynne Gorman as Trudy
 George Merner as Dr. Stahlbaum
 Stephanie Morgenstern as Louise Stahlbaum
 Christopher Owens as Erik
 Diane Stapley as Mrs. Ingrid Stahlbaum 
 Mona Waserman as Princess Perlipat
 Noam Zylberman as Fritz Stahlbaum

Additional voices
 Len Carlson as King, Mouse, Court Attendant, Band Member #2, Spectator and Soldier
 Marvin Goldhar as Mr. Schaeffer, Mouse, Guest #3, First Guard, Soldier, Band Member #1, Contestant and Spectator
 Keith Hampshire as Mouse, Guest, Second Guard, Contestant, Spectator and Soldier
 Elizabeth Hanna as Marie, Mrs. Schaeffer, Doll, Guest #4 and Spectator
 Susan Roman as Mouse, Mrs. Miller, Guest #1, Doll and Spectator
 Theresa Sears as Queen, Mouse, Guest #2, Doll and Spectator

Production

Development
In the late 1980s, Warner Bros. began production on their film Rover Dangerfield, with the intention of a 1988 release. The film was originally intended to be R-rated, in the vein of Ralph Bakshi's films, but during production executives requested that the idea be reworked into a family-friendly film. This resulted in production being delayed, as large portions of the film had to be redone. While Rover Dangerfield was being completed, the studio looked at external production companies to source animated films they could release, which is how Warner Bros. came to partner with Lacewood Productions to release The Nutcracker Prince.

Music

The music was adapted in part from Tchaikovsky's The Nutcracker from 1892 by Victor Davies, altering the original and adding new tracks as well. For the recording, Boris Brott conducted the London Symphony Orchestra.

In 1990,  Atlantic Records gave away Promotional recordings of the single "Always Come Back to You" as performed by Robert Matarazzo and Rachele Cappelli. The song, which was used during the first dance between Clara and the Nutcracker, featured David Fields on Guitar, Shane Keister on the keyboard, and David Beal on Drums.

Release

Box office
The Nutcracker Prince opened in 906 screens across the United States on November 21, 1990, the film only earned a disappointing $1.7 million because Warner Bros., which owned the American distribution rights, gave it very little promotion. It opened in Canadian theaters two days later on November 23, and also only pulled in $2 million in theatrical revenues in Canada.

Home media
The film was initially released on VHS on November 27, 1991 by Warner Home Video in the United States and Cineplex Odeon Video in Canada. It was later re-released on August 13, 1996 as part of the Warner Bros. Classic Tales series, and again in 1999 through Warner Bros. Family Entertainment.

The film has been released on DVD several times. It was initially released by Hollywood DVD on October 14, 2001 in the United Kingdom. A Region 1 DVD was released in Canada and the US by GoodTimes Entertainment on November 9, 2004. This DVD was sourced from the Canadian print, as a result, this caused the Warner Bros. Pictures and Warner Bros. Presents notice that was used on the American Theatrical and VHS release to be deleted. On April 2, 2007, it was released in on DVD for the second time in the United Kingdom by Boulevard Entertainment. Both releases have no extras besides animated menus and a theatrical trailer.

Reception

Critical response
The film had received negative reviews from critics. A review in TV Guide stated that "regrettably, this animated film is an unabashed bore, and that's a shame because the glorious Tchaikovsky ballet has been loved and admired by generations of stage, film, and television viewers of all ages. Why Warner Bros. selected this Canadian-produced independent feature as its Christmas 1990 family attraction is puzzling, given the lackluster quality of the production." Charles Solomon of the Los Angeles Times said that "watching “The Nutcracker Prince,” a new Canadian animated feature, is every bit as much fun as getting underwear for Christmas when you’re 8 years old. A blend of leaden gags, muddled storytelling and Saturday morning-style animation, it’s more a holiday threat than a treat."

Roger Ebert of Chicago Sun-Times was critical of the film, calling it "innocuous." "The level of imagination in the story is about as inventive as on most Saturday morning cartoon shows." He also panned the characterization of the Nutcracker as a "monster", adding:  He also named it one of the worst films of 1990, calling it "a witless and lackluster animated film relieved only by occasional snatches of The Nutcracker Suite". He and co-host Gene Siskel subsequently recalled that the picture went blank at a preview screening they attended; he said neither of them bothered to tell the projectionist to turn the picture back on because the film "was better that way".

On Rotten Tomatoes the film has an approval rating of 14%.

Accolades

See also
 The Nutcracker and the Mouse King
 The Nutcracker
 Canadian animation
 List of Christmas films

References

External links
 
 
 
 
 
 The Nutcracker Prince at Keyframe - the Animation Resource

1990 films
1990 animated films
1990s musical fantasy films
Animated musical films
Canadian animated feature films
Canadian Christmas films
Canadian coming-of-age films
Canadian musical fantasy films
Canadian independent films
1990s English-language films
Films about royalty
Films based on The Nutcracker and the Mouse King
Films set in Germany
Animated Christmas films
Warner Bros. films
Warner Bros. animated films
Alliance Atlantis films
1990s Christmas films
Films about curses
Films about shapeshifting
1990s children's animated films
Films set in the 19th century
English-language Canadian films
1990s American films
1990s Canadian films